The Marble Palace, located at 46, Muktaram Babu Street, Kolkata 700007, is a palatial mansion located in North Kolkata, India, which was built by Raja Rajendra Mullick in 1835 and contains many beautiful Western sculptures, pieces of Victorian furniture, and paintings by European and Indian artists.  Large chandeliers, clocks, and busts of kings and queens decorate the hallways of the palace. It is famous for marble wall & floors, antiques, paintings by Rubens, curios, marble statues, floor to ceiling mirrors and for its collection of rare birds. 
Marble Palace is still lived in. Entrance is restricted and permission must be obtained from the government tourist office.

Located next to the palace is the Marble Palace Zoo, which was the first zoo opened in India, also by Raja Rajendra Mullick. It now primarily serves as an aviary, including peacocks, toucans, storks, and cranes.

Notes

External links
 Official website of: "Central Zoo Authority of India" (CZA), Government of India

Zoos in West Bengal
Aviaries
Buildings and structures in Kolkata
Tourist attractions in Kolkata
1854 establishments in India
Zoos established in 1854